Robur is Latin for "hard timber" or "oak", and, by metaphorical extension, "strength". It can refer to:

 Robur the Conqueror, an 1886 novel by Jules Verne, also known as The Clipper of the Clouds
 Master of the World (novel), Verne's sequel novel, starring the same character
 Robur (truck), an East German truck brand
 Robur Carolinum (Latin for Charles' oak), a constellation named by the English astronomer Sir Edmond Halley in 1679
 Robur (company), a wholesale coal merchant

See also 
   Robor, the Gaulish god